In the ticketing system of the British rail network, a Permit to Travel provisionally allows passengers to travel on a train when they have not purchased a ticket in advance and the ticket office of the station they are travelling from is closed, without incurring a penalty fare.

Because some rail passengers may travel without having their tickets checked at any point of their journey, particularly at off-peak times when stations are less likely to be staffed, the obligation to possess a Permit to Travel allows the collection of at least some revenue from passengers who would otherwise travel for free. Most train operating companies (TOCs) have altered their penalty fare policies and have removed many permit to travel machines. PERTIS machines at larger stations have also in recent years given way to more sophisticated self-service ticket machines.

History
The system, known officially as PERTIS (Permit to Travel Issuing System ), was first introduced by Network SouthEast in November 1988 on the LTS route between London Fenchurch Street and Shoeburyness. The machines, which closely resemble those found in pay and display car parks, were manufactured by Almex Control Systems. Machines were given the designation AS-9 (wall-mounted) or AS-88 (mounted on a metal base), but internal workings and tickets were identical in each case.

Penalty fare schemes spread across Network SouthEast in subsequent years, with AS-88 machines being used exclusively. Railway stations in the West Midlands and West Yorkshire passenger transport executive areas subsequently had schemes put in place, and machines were installed accordingly.

Use and operation
The front panel of the machine has two LCD displays; one shows the current time, while the other displays the amount paid when coins have been fed in.  A button is pressed to print the permit, which shows a serial number, the station name, the date and time. The passenger is supposed to insert coins as near to the value of the fare as possible (if they know the fare and have enough coins), and some machines have a list of common local single and return fares.

Permits to travel bear the warning that they are not fare tickets and must be exchanged for one at the first opportunity. The record of the station of issue means that passengers who travel using it cannot claim that they just boarded the train (allowing them to travel on a cheaper fare) if they are not reached by a ticket inspector until a few stops after boarding. Permits to travel are in any case valid for only two hours from the time shown on them.

If holders of a permit to travel are asked to present their ticket by an inspector, they will be asked where they are travelling to and issued with the appropriate ticket and will be charged the difference between the balance already paid, as stated on the permit and the full cost of the ticket for their journey. If they have already paid the full price of the ticket, it will be exchanged for the permit and no money will change hands.

Because any amount of money on a valid permit to travel will ensure that a passenger cannot be charged a penalty fare, it is entirely possible (if the passenger is not encountered by an inspector, who will sell a full ticket) to make a two-hour train journey for as little as five pence (the lowest denomination coin the machine will accept) without breaching any fare regulations.

When a station is staffed and its ticket office open, the machine will usually be deactivated, with a light illuminated to indicate that proper tickets should be purchased.

Within train operating companies, a distinction is made between ticket inspectors and "Revenue Protection Inspectors" or "Authorised Penalty Fare Officers". Only the latter have the authority to issue penalty fares where a ticket or permit is not held.

Other countries 
A similar ticket is known in Germany as Fahrkarte Anfangsstrecke. It can be acquired at older Deutsche Bahn ticket machines and is priced at €15.00.

References 

Fare collection systems in the United Kingdom

de:Fahrkarte#Fahrkartenarten